Kiersztanowo may refer to the following places:
Kiersztanowo, Mrągowo County in Warmian-Masurian Voivodeship (north Poland)
Kiersztanowo, Olsztyn County in Warmian-Masurian Voivodeship (north Poland)
Kiersztanowo, Ostróda County in Warmian-Masurian Voivodeship (north Poland)